Donkeyskin is a French literary fairytale written in verse by Charles Perrault. It was first published in 1695 in a small volume and republished in 1697 in Perrault's Histoires ou contes du temps passé. Andrew Lang included it, somewhat euphemized, in The Grey Fairy Book. It is classed among folktales of Aarne-Thompson type 510B, unnatural love.

Synopsis

An extremely fortunate and wealthy king lives with his beautiful wife and daughter. The source of the king's riches is his prized, marvelous donkey whose droppings are gold. Suddenly the king's wife is struck by an illness and dies, but not before making her husband promise not to remarry except to a woman whose beauty and attributes equal hers. The king grieves for a lengthy period, but is finally persuaded to seek another wife. It becomes clear that the only woman who fits the promise is his daughter.

The princess goes to her godmother, the lilac fairy, for guidance. The fairy advises her goddaughter to make impossible demands to the king as a condition of her consent: a dress all the colors of the sky, a dress the color of the moon, a dress as bright as the sun, and finally, the hide of his precious donkey. Despite the difficulty of the princess's requirements, such is the king's determination to marry her that he grants all of them. The lilac fairy gives her goddaughter a magic chest to contain the dresses, and tells her to leave home, wearing the donkey's skin as a disguise.

The princess flees to another kingdom and eventually finds work and lodging at a farm. The princess's appearance is so unsightly that she is nicknamed "Donkeyskin." On holidays, Donkeyskin locks herself in her room, primping and dressing herself in the fine gowns her father had given her. On one such day, the prince of the kingdom comes by her room and glimpses her through the keyhole. The prince falls madly in love and becomes ill with longing; he declares that only a cake baked by Donkeyskin will cure him.

While Donkeyskin bakes the cake, her ring somehow falls into the mixture. The prince finds it and declares that he will marry only the woman whose finger it fits. When every other woman in the kingdom fails to fit it, Donkeyskin is summoned to try it on. The ring, to everyone's shock, fits perfectly; and the princess removes the donkey's skin to reveal her rich dress underneath. The lilac fairy appears and explains the whole story to the prince's parents; who, upon learning Donkeyskin's true identity, are elated with the match. Donkeyskin and the prince celebrate their wedding. There, Donkeyskin is reunited with her father, who has remarried to a beautiful widow.

Analysis

Tale type
The tale is classified in the international Aarne-Thompson-Uther Index as ATU 510B, "The Dress of Gold, of Silver, and of Stars (Cap O'Rushes)". However, the tale type was renamed "Peau d’Asne" by German folklorist Hans-Jörg Uther in his 2004 revision of the folktale index, while still retaining its numbering.

Motifs 
According to scholarship, the tale type features the death of the heroine's mother, her father's incestuous desire, and her fleeing to another kingdom, where she finds work in a menial position.

Origins 
In a study, scholar Ruth Bottigheimer notes that, before Perrault's tale, French author Bonaventure des Périers had a heroine (named Pernette) dressed in a donkey's hide (albeit to repel a lover's advances), and, in a later tale, a heroine is called "Peau d’Asne", but she is helped by ants. Bottigheimer also suggests that Perrault did not introduce the incest motif, but must have reworked it from an earlier source, namely, Giambattista Basile's The She-Bear (from Pentamerone) and Straparola's Teobaldo (from The Facetious Nights).

Relation to other tales 
According to Ton Deker and Stith Thompson, after the heroine flees home and finds work elsewhere, the second part of the tale type (the three balls and three dresses) connects tale type 510B to type 510A, that is, Cinderella.

Variants

Europe

Greece 
In a Greek variant from Epeirus collected by Austrian consul Johann Georg von Hahn with the title Allerleirauh, a widowed king declares he wants to marry his own daughter, despite her protests. To delay him, the princess asks him to fashion her two dresses of gold and a bed that can furrow through the ground to reach any other place. The king gives her the requested items; she takes the dresses, some ducats for money, jumps on the bed and goes to another city. The city's prince, during a hunt, finds the princess, wrapped in furs, in the forest and takes her in as a goose herder. Some time later, this prince holds a grand ball, and the princess attends it with her dress of gold. She dazzles the prince, but escapes the ball back to her low station, and throws some ducats to delay the prince. He becomes interested in finding her, so he holds two more balls. After the third ball, the princess loses one of her shoes and the prince tries it on every maiden, but cannot find its owner. At last, the princess, still wearing her golden dress underneath the animal furs, goes to bring some water to the prince, and he recognizes her.

Von Hahn summarized a Greek tale from Smyrna: after his wife dies, a king promises to marry one that can fit the dead queen's ring on her finger. The ring fits on his daughter, and he tries to marry her. To stop her father, she is advised by a being named Miren to ask for three seamless dresses: one of silver, another of gold and a third of pearl. The devil, disguised as an old man, gives the king the dresses, to the princess's horror. Miren guides the princess to a cave in the outskirts of another town, and she gives food and water for the princess for six months. One day, a prince, during a hunt, stops to rest in front of the cave and prepares some food. Drawn by the smell, the princess comes out of the cave; the prince finds her and takes her in to his castle. The princess, called Μαλλιαρή due to her hairy appearance, she only nods in agreement as she does her chores. The prince then holds three balls, one on each night, and the princess, doffing her shaggy appearance, wears each of the dresses for each night. The prince becomes ill with longing, and his mother asks for some food to be prepared for him. The princess bakes a bread for him and hides her ring, then a clock, and lastly a string of pearls.

East Slavs 
Tale type ATU 510B also exists in the repertoire of the East Slavs. According to the East Slavic Folktale Catalogue, last updated by scholar  in 1979, the type is known as SUS 510B, "": on threat of an incestuous marriage with her own father, the heroine asks for three dresses to be made (one of stars, one of the moon and one of the sun); she wears a pigskin and finds work elsewhere; a prince holds three balls that she attends, and he goes after her.

Portugal 

Italy 
In a Sicilian tale collected by folklorist Giuseppe Pitrè with the title Pilusedda, a king and a queen have a beautiful daughter. One day, the queen falls ill and bids her husband marry any other woman that can fit her own ring. After she dies, the princess unsuspectedly tries on her mother's ring, and is found out by the king, who wishes to marry her. Horrified at the idea, the princess consults with a wise man, who advises her to ask her father for three dresses: one the colour of the sky, embroidered in gold and bedecked with stones like the sun, the moon and the planets; one of a sea-green colour and decorated with the houses of the countryside; and one rose-coloured dress with four rows of bangles and tiny golden bells. The king summons his cousin, who is a devil, and arranges the three dresses for his daughter. As a last resort, the wise man gives the princess three hazelnuts and advises her to wear a horse-skin as disguise. The princess does so and flees to another kingdom, where she is found by a prince's gamekeeper and brought to the castle as a kitchen maid. She prepares the prince three pieces of bread on different occasions, and places her father's watch, her father's tiepin and a golden ring inside. The prince finds the objects inside the food and suspects Pilusedda is more than what she appears. Later, the prince invites Pilusedda to accompany him to the Royal Chapel, but she declines. After he leaves, she takes off the horse-skin, cracks open a hazelnut and wears one of the dresses her father gave her to the chapel, where she dazzles the prince. After her third visit to the Royal Chapel, the prince follows her carriage and discovers the mysterious maiden at the Chapel was Pilusedda. They marry.

Americas

United States 
American folklorist Leonard W. Roberts collected a tale from a Kentucky teller of French descent, in Beattyville, Kentucky. In this tale, titled The Princess in the Donkey Skin, a king plans to marry his daughter to the ugly king of Faraway Land, but the princess refuses and declares she would rather live in a donkey's skin than marry him. Considering it a provocation, the king gives her the donkey's skin and banishes her from the palace. The princess wanders off and finds work with an old woman in her hut. Later, the king of Faraway Land and his son, after a hunt, go to the old woman's hut to eat, and the old woman orders the princess to prepare them dinner. The princess cooks some soup for the royal guests and lets a diamond ring slip inside. The prince eats the soup, finds the ring and pockets it. Meanwhile, the princess is crying in her room, when a fairy godmother appears and turns her into a "purty" girl, with diamonds in her hair and with a beautiful dress. The princess, in new clothes, goes to the balcony under the moonlight. The prince sees her and, falling in love, comes to court her. The princess then leaves. The prince returns later for a second visit and meets the princess again. With the ring in hand, he decides to look for its owner all over the world. Failing that, he then goes back to the girl in the donkey's skin and places her ring on her finger. Finding the ring's owner, the prince and princess marry.

Retellings and adaptations
 Das Himmelskleid (1927), an opera by Ermanno Wolf-Ferrari
Peau d'âne (Donkey Skin) (1970), a French film directed by Jacques Demy and starring Jean Marais and Catherine Deneuve
Donkey Skin (1976), a translation by Angela Carter for The Fairy Tales of Charles Perrault
The Donkey's Hide (1982), a Soviet film adaptation.
 Sapsorrow (1988), an episode of Jim Henson's TV series The Storyteller 
Deerskin (1993), a novel by Robin McKinley
 Donkeyskin (1995), a short story by Terri Windling
 Donkeyskin (1995), a poem by Midori Snyder
 The Tale of the Skin (1997), a short story by Emma Donoghue
 Pelzmantel: A Medieval Tale (2003), a novel by K. A. Laity
Unnatural Issue (2011), a novel by Mercedes Lackey
 The Color Master (2013), a post-modern fairy tale by Aimee Bender detailing the struggle of the dressmakers.
 Riverbed (2017), a short story by Deirdre Sullivan
 "Donkeyskin" or "Faith" is a character in Telltale's game series The Wolf Among Us.
 The Grimm Fairytale All Kinds of Fur can be considered a variant on the tale.

See also

 Allerleirauh
 The Goose That Laid the Golden Eggs
 The Wishing-Table, the Gold-Ass, and the Cudgel in the Sack

References

Further reading

 Goldberg, Christine. "The Donkey Skin Folktale Cycle (AT 510B)". In: The Journal of American Folklore 110, no. 435 (1997): 28-46. doi:10.2307/541584.
 Harf, Laurence. "Le conte de Peau d'Ane dans la littérature du Moyen Age et du XVIe siècle". In: Bulletin de l'Association d'étude sur l'humanisme, la réforme et la renaissance, n°11/1, 1980. La littérature populaire aux XVème et XVIème siècles. Actes du deuxieme colloque de Goutelas (21-23 septembre 1979) pp. 35-42. [DOI: https://doi.org/10.3406/rhren.1980.1164] ; www.persee.fr/doc/rhren_0181-6799_1980_num_11_1_1164
 Jorgensen, Jeana. "Sorting Out Donkey Skin (ATU 510B): Toward an Integrative Literal-Symbolic Analysis of Fairy Tales" In: Cultural Analysis 11 (2012): 91-120. Available at https://digitalcommons.butler.edu/facsch_papers/677
 Meyer, Ole. "The First Oral Folk Tale Ever?". In: Fabula 61, no. 3-4 (2020): 316-334. https://doi.org/10.1515/fabula-2020-0017
 Maynard, Rachel L., "Some Things Grew No Less With Time:" Tracing ATU 510B from the Thirteenth to the Twentieth Century (2017). Electronic Theses and Dissertations. Paper 3229. https://dc.etsu.edu/etd/3229
 Mifsud Chircop, G. (1981). "The dress of stars, of sea and of earth (at 510B) - an analysis of the Maltese Cinderella Marchen within the Mediterranean tradition area". In: Journal of Maltese Studies, 14, 48-55.
 Rzepnikowska, Iwona. "Сюжетный тип 510В "Ослиная шкура" в польской сказочной традиции" [STORIES OF THE ATU 510В “DONKEY SKIN” TYPE IN THE POLISH FAIRYTALE TRADITION]. In: Традиционная культура 2019, № 1, t. 20, s. 43-51. . (In Russian)

External links

Other tales of type ATU 510B by D. L. Ashliman

French fairy tales
Works by Charles Perrault
Fictional princesses
Female characters in fairy tales
Incest in fiction
ATU 500-559